The 1994 Grand Prix de Tennis de Lyon was a men's tennis tournament played on indoor carpet courts at the Palais des Sports de Gerland in Lyon, France, and was part of the World Series of the 1994 ATP Tour. It was the eighth edition of the tournament and ran from 17 October through 24 October 1994. Fifth-seeded Marc Rosset won the singles title, his second after 1990.

Finals

Singles

 Marc Rosset defeated  Jim Courier 6–4, 7–6(7–2)
 It was Rosset's 2nd title of the year and the 15th of his career.

Doubles

 Jakob Hlasek /  Yevgeny Kafelnikov defeated  Martin Damm /  Patrick Rafter 6–7, 7–6, 7–6
 It was Hlasek's only title of the year and the 24th of his career. It was Kafelnikov's 7th title of the year and the 7th of his career.

References

External links
 ITF tournament edition details

Grand Prix de Tennis de Lyon
1994
Grand Prix de Tennis de Lyon